Joseph Vuillard was a French rower. He competed in the men's eight event at the 1928 Summer Olympics.

References

External links
 

Year of birth missing
Possibly living people
French male rowers
Olympic rowers of France
Rowers at the 1928 Summer Olympics
Place of birth missing